Madampitiya is a suburb in Colombo, Sri Lanka. It is part of the postal area Colombo 15.

References

Populated places in Western Province, Sri Lanka